The 2000 Campeonato Paulista de Futebol Profissional da Primeira Divisão - Série A1 was the 99th season of São Paulo's top professional football league. São Paulo won the championship by the 20th time. América and Araçatuba were relegated.

Championship

First phase
The first phase was disputed by all the teams of the championship, save for Corinthians, Palmeiras, Santos and São Paulo, which would dispute the Rio-São Paulo tournament at the time and would only enter in the second phase. The teams would be divided in two groups of six teams, and all would qualify for the second phase, except for the team with the fewest points out of the twelve, which would be relegated to the second phase of second level of that year, and replaced by the team that won the first phase of the second level.

Group 1

Group 2

Second phase
In the second phase, the 11 qualified teams were joined by Botafogo, winner of the first phase of the second level, and the four participants of the Rio-São Paulo tournament. The 16 teams were divided in four groups of four teams, with each team playing twice against the teams of its own group, and once against the teams of other group (3 against 5 and 4 against 6), with the two best teams in each group qualifying to the Quarterfinals and the team with the fewest points among all the 16 being relegated to the Second level of the following year.

Group 3

Group 4

Group 5

Group 6

Quarterfinals

Group 7

Group 8

Semifinals

|}

Finals

|}

References

Campeonato Paulista seasons
Paulista